"Virtual Reality" is a single released by the Italian singer Alexia solely in Finland in 1997. The song was released on two-track CD only by Dancepool in 1997. Alexia's management team at DWA (who had been releasing and licensing all of Alexia's music) did not know about the release of this single.

Instead a version of "Virtual Reality" credited to E.Y.E. featuring Alexia was released by DWA in Italy in early 1997. Only samples of Alexia's vocals rather than the whole song were used, though the music was the same. The E.Y.E. version was released before Alexia's debut album Fan Club was released, which contained the track.

Official versions

Single release
Album Version 4:11
Radio Edit 3:08
JS16 Clubmix 5:11

E.Y.E. release
Radio Mix 4:05
Extended Virtual Mix 5:52
Acappella 1:40

References

1997 singles
Alexia (Italian singer) songs
Songs written by Roberto Zanetti
Songs written by Alexia (Italian singer)
1997 songs